The 17th Golden Globe Awards, honoring the best in film for 1959 films, were held on March 10, 1960.

Winners and nominees

Film

Best Film - Drama
 Ben-Hur
Anatomy of a Murder
The Diary of Anne Frank
The Nun's Story
On the Beach

Best Film - Comedy
 Some Like It Hot
But Not For Me
Operation Petticoat
Pillow Talk
Who Was That Lady?

Best Film - Musical
 Porgy and Bess
The Five Pennies
Li'l Abner
Say One for Me
A Private's Affair

Best Actor - Drama
 Anthony Franciosa - Career
Richard Burton - Look Back In Anger
Charlton Heston - Ben-Hur
Fredric March - Middle of the Night
Joseph Schildkraut - The Diary of Anne Frank

Best Actress - Drama
 Elizabeth Taylor - Suddenly, Last Summer
Audrey Hepburn - The Nun's Story
Katharine Hepburn - Suddenly, Last Summer
Lee Remick - Anatomy of a Murder
Simone Signoret - Room at the Top

Best Actor - Musical or Comedy
 Jack Lemmon - Some Like It Hot
Clark Gable - But Not For Me
Cary Grant - Operation Petticoat
Dean Martin - Who Was That Lady?
Sidney Poitier - Porgy and Bess

Best Actress - Musical or Comedy
 Marilyn Monroe - Some Like It Hot
Dorothy Dandridge - Porgy and Bess
Doris Day - Pillow Talk
Shirley MacLaine - Ask Any Girl
Lilli Palmer - But Not For Me

Best Supporting Actor
 Stephen Boyd - Ben-Hur
Fred Astaire - On the Beach
Tony Randall - Pillow Talk
Robert Vaughn - The Young Philadelphians
Joseph Welch - Anatomy of a Murder

Best Supporting Actress
 Susan Kohner - Imitation of Life
Edith Evans - The Nun's Story
Estelle Hemsley - Take a Giant Step
Juanita Moore - Imitation of Life
Shelley Winters - The Diary of Anne Frank

Best Director
 William Wyler - Ben-Hur
Stanley Kramer - On the Beach
Otto Preminger - Anatomy of a Murder
George Stevens - The Diary of Anne Frank
Fred Zinnemann - The Nun's Story

Best Foreign Film
Black Orpheus (France)
Odd Obsession (Japan)
The Bridge (Germany)
Wild Strawberries (Sweden)
Wir Wunderkinder (Germany)

Best Music, Original Score
Ernest Gold - On the Beach

Best Film Promoting International Understanding
 The Diary of Anne Frank
The Nun's Story
Odds Against Tomorrow
On the Beach
Take a Giant Step

Most Promising Newcomer - Male
Barry Coe
Troy Donahue
George Hamilton
James Shigeta
 Michael Callan

Most Promising Newcomer - Female
Angie Dickinson
Janet Munro
Stella Stevens
Tuesday Weld
 Diane Baker

Achievement in Television
Edward R. Murrow

Outstanding Merit
The Nun's Story

Special Award
Andrew Marton - Ben-Hur (For directing the chariot race)
Francis X. Bushman (For a famous silent film star)
Ramon Novarro (For a famous silent film star)

Special Journalistic Merit Award
Hedda Hopper
Louella Parsons

Henrietta Award (World Film Favorite)
Doris Day
Rock Hudson

Samuel Goldwyn Award
Room at the Top

Cecil B. DeMille Award
Bing Crosby

References
IMdb 1960 Golden Globe Awards

017
1959 film awards
1959 television awards
1959 awards in the United States
March 1960 events in the United States